Guilherme Posser da Costa (born 18 May 1953) is a São Toméan who served as the ninth prime minister of São Tomé and Príncipe from 1999 to 2001.

Posser da Costa served as Minister of Foreign Affairs: 1987-1988, 1990-1991, and 1994-1996. He later served as Prime Minister from 5 January 1999 to 26 September 2001.

Biography 
Guilherme Posser da Costa was born on 18 May 1953 in São Tomé, the main city of then-Portuguese São Tomé and Príncipe.  He studied law at the University of Coimbra in Portugal, specializing in legal science; he graduated in June 1978. He is married and has three children.

Posser da Costa pursued a political career in the Movement for the Liberation of Sao Tome and Principe/Social Democratic Party (MLSTP/PSD), which was the sole legal party until the introduction of a multiparty system in 1991. He has held the parliamentary functions of deputy and vice-president of the National Assembly.  Within the Ministry of Foreign Affairs, Posser da Costa served as Director of Political Affairs, Secretary of State and then Minister on three occasions: from 1987 to 1988, 1990 to 1991 and 1994 to 1996. He has also been Ambassador Extraordinary and Plenipotentiary to Belgium, France, Germany, the Netherlands, Sweden, the European Community and the Food and Agriculture Organization.  He was Prime Minister from 5 January 1999 to 26 September 2001.

In early November 2004, Posser da Costa allegedly damaged the office of Attorney General Adelino Pereira in an attack. Pereira said this was due to an investigation regarding embezzlement of aid funds and ordered Posser da Costa's arrest. Due to the alleged attack, Posser da Costa resigned from parliament on 15 February 2005, just before his parliamentary immunity was to be removed. On 18 March 2005, he received a two-year suspended sentence for damaging Pereira's office and "insulting public authority"; he was also required to pay compensation. For his part, Posser da Costa said that Pereira had falsely accused him of being involved in the embezzlement of aid funds, and that he had only been a witness in that case, not a suspect.

Posser da Costa was a member of the National Commission and the Political Commission of the MLSTP/PSD, and Vice President under the leadership of founder and former President Manuel Pinto da Costa.  At the Fourth Congress of the MLSTP/PSD, Posser da Costa was elected party President on 27 February 2005, succeeding Pinto da Costa. There were 708 votes in favor of Posser da Costa, who was the only candidate, and three votes against him.  He held this position until 2010, when he was replaced by Aurelio Martins.

Posser da Costa was nominated as the MLSTP/PSD candidate in the 2021 presidential election.  Although he won the support of the MLSTP/PSD National Council with 83% of the vote, his competitors for the nomination chose to register as independent candidates in the election.

Honours 

   Grand Cross, Order of Prince Henry (1996)

References

1953 births
Living people
Foreign Ministers of São Tomé and Príncipe
Movement for the Liberation of São Tomé and Príncipe/Social Democratic Party politicians
Heads of government who were later imprisoned
University of Coimbra alumni
Grand Crosses of the Order of Prince Henry
20th-century São Tomé and Príncipe politicians
21st-century São Tomé and Príncipe politicians